Epacris browniae is a species of flowering plant in the heath family Ericaceae and is endemic to a small area of New South Wales. It is an erect, woody shrub with wand-like branchlets, crowded, glabrous, trowel-shaped leaves and tube-shaped flowers with white petals.

Description
The stamen filaments are fused to the petal tube and the anthers are level with the end of the tube.

Taxonomy
Epacris browniae was first formally described in 2015 by David Coleby in the journal Telopea from specimens he collected from near Wentworth Falls in 2014. The specific epithet (browniae) honours epacris researcher Elizabeth Anne Brown.

Distribution and habitat
This epacris grows on rocky outcrops in scrub and heath in the Blue Mountains in eastern New South Wales.

References

Flora of New South Wales
browniae
Ericales of Australia
Plants described in 2015